Maria Zankovetska Theatre (Natsionalnyi akademichnyi ukrayinskyi dramatychnyi teatr imeni Mariyi Zankovetskoyi) is a drama theatre in the centre of Lviv, Ukraine, at the intersection of  Lesya Ukrayinka Street and Prospekt Svobody. The building was erected in the mid 19th century and until World War I was used as a theatre stage and a session hall of the regional council.

History

The theatre was founded by Count Stanisław Marcin Skarbek (pl) (1780–1848) Abdank coat of arms, who as early as 1819 had applied for permission from the Austrian Imperial authorities to build it following the final Partition of Poland. Construction of the theatre’s neoclassical building began in 1837, the project was designed by architects Jan Salzmann and Ludwig Pichl. The complex was built in the location of bastions, which surrounded the Lower Castle and its foundation was made of 16,000 oak logs. In 1842 it was the third biggest building of Central Europe. Apart from the theatre itself, the complex also included apartments, for such famous personalities as Artur Grottger and Juliusz Kossak. On the opening day, March 28, 1842, a Franz Grillparzer play in the German language was presented, and on the next day, Aleksander Fredro's play Śluby panieńskie was presented, this time in Polish.

In initial years, plays both in Polish and German were presented, and this lasted until 1871, when all German plays were withdrawn and the theatre became a Polish-language only. In 1872, operas were also presented, which made Skarbek Theatre the sole opera scene in Galicia. 

In late years of the 19th century, the complex became insufficient, and in 1900, it was augmented by a brand new building of the Grand Theatre. Skarbek Theatre was turned into a philharmonic, then into a cinema. Currently, it is home of the Ukrainian Dramatic Theatre of Maria Zankovetska. On May 18, 2008, celebrations of the 50th anniversary of the Polish People's Theatre of Lviv took place in the complex, with performance of a play by Marian Hemar.

Notes

References 
Theater's Official website
Agnieszka Marszlek Cztery wieki lwowskiego teatru
Piotr Marek Stanski Okolicznosci powstania i otwarcia Lwowskiego Teatru Wielkiego we Lwowie
Stanislaw Peplowski Sily sceny lwowskiej
Karol Cieszewski Kilka uwag o lwowskim teatrze
 Current repertoire of the theater (Lviv city official website)

Theatres in Lviv
Theatres completed in 1842
1842 establishments in the Austrian Empire
Neoclassical architecture in Ukraine
Institutions with the title of National in Ukraine